Richard Sharp may refer to:

 Richard Sharp (BBC chairman) (born 1956), English banker and BBC chairman
 Richard Sharp (executive) (1927–2014), American business and retail executive
 Richard Sharp (footballer) (born 1956), Scottish footballer
 Richard Sharp (politician) (1759–1835), British hat-maker, banker, merchant, poet, critic, Member of Parliament, and conversationalist
 Richard Sharp (priest) (1916–1982), British Anglican priest, Archdeacon of Dorset
 Richard Sharp (rugby union) (born 1938), English rugby player and cricketer
 Richard Hey Sharp (1793–1853), English architect

See also
 Richard Sharpe (disambiguation)